Paramesia gnomana is a species of moth belonging to the  family Tortricidae, first described by Carl Alexander Clerck in 1759.

Description
It is similar to Clepsis spectrana, but it is paler. These moths fly from June to August.

Caterpillars are polyphagous, feeding from May to June on a wide range of herbaceous plants, shrubs and trees, especially on bilberry (Vaccinium myrtillus), Stachys species, Iris species, plantain (Plantago species), and dandelion (Taraxacum species).

Distribution and habitat
This species is present in most of Europe and in the Near East. It prefers dry grassland habitats.

References

External links
 Lepiforum.de
 Lepidoptera of Belgium

Archipini
Moths described in 1759
Moths of Asia
Taxa named by Carl Alexander Clerck
Tortricidae of Europe